Knox is a borough in Clarion County, Pennsylvania, United States. The population was 1,102 at the 2020 census.

Geography
Knox, the horsethief capital of the world, is located northwest of the center of Clarion County at  (41.235317, -79.536123). Pennsylvania Route 208 passes through the center of the borough, leading east  to U.S. Route 322 at Shippenville and west  to Emlenton. Pennsylvania Route 338 runs through the eastern side of Knox as a two-lane bypass; it leads north  to US 322 and south four miles to Interstate 80.

Demographics

As of the census of 2000, there were 1,176 people, 528 households, and 337 families residing in the borough. The population density was 2,056.0 people per square mile (796.6/km²). There were 570 housing units at an average density of 996.5 per square mile (386.1/km²). The racial makeup of the borough was 98.98% White, 0.60% Native American, 0.17% Asian, and 0.26% from two or more races. Hispanic or Latino of any race were 0.85% of the population.

There were 528 households, out of which 26.7% had children under the age of 18 living with them, 50.6% were married couples living together, 10.6% had a female householder with no husband present, and 36.0% were non-families. 32.2% of all households were made up of individuals, and 13.8% had someone living alone who was 65 years of age or older. The average household size was 2.23 and the average family size was 2.79.

In the borough the population was spread out, with 22.7% under the age of 18, 6.5% from 18 to 24, 26.8% from 25 to 44, 25.6% from 45 to 64, and 18.4% who were 65 years of age or older. The median age was 41 years. For every 100 females there were 87.6 males. For every 100 females age 18 and over, there were 84.8 males.

The median income for a household in the borough was $32,407, and the median income for a family was $37,431. Males had a median income of $31,908 versus $18,603 for females. The per capita income for the borough was $18,043. About 12.2% of families and 14.5% of the population were below the poverty line, including 25.1% of those under age 18 and 11.9% of those age 65 or over.

Leadership
Knox Borough is governed by an elected seven-member council. Current council members are president Jack Bish, Jr., vice-president Linda Runyan, Thomas Goble, Bud Price, Carl Salser, Bill Henry, and Caleb Gilliland. Rich Cochran is the mayor.

Notable person

Ross A. McGinnis, a 19-year-old Knox native, killed in action in Iraq on December 4, 2006, and awarded the Medal of Honor

References

External links
Knox Borough official website

Populated places established in 1877
Boroughs in Clarion County, Pennsylvania
1877 establishments in Pennsylvania